Dark Hollow Run is a tributary of Crooked Creek in Indiana County, Pennsylvania.

References

Rivers of Indiana County, Pennsylvania
Rivers of Pennsylvania